Reading Senior High School, colloquially known as The Castle on The Hill, is a 9–12 public high school in Reading, Pennsylvania. It was established in 1927 and is part of the Reading School District. It is the largest traditional high school in the Commonwealth of Pennsylvania with a total enrollment of 5,498 students as of the 2020-2021 school year.

Student Life
The school supports a broad range of extracurricular activities. In the 2020-2021 school year, students could participate in Academic Challenge, Aevidium, Art Club, Baba Na Kaka International, Ecology, Knight Vision, Mock Trial, Peer Mentoring, Project Peace, E-Sports, National Honor Society, Sign Language Club, Strategic Gaming Club, Student Council, Tabletop Roleplay, World Language Club, and Yearbook.

Athletics
The school's mascot is the Red Knight. According to the PIAA directory, the District funds participation in the following sports:

Girls
Basketball – AAAAAA
Bowling – AAAAAA
Cheerleading – AAAAAA
Cross Country – AAA
JROTC Drill Team – AAA
Field Hockey – AAA
Indoor Track and Field – AAAA
Soccer (Fall) – AAAA
Softball – AAAAAA
Swimming and Diving – AAA
Girls' Tennis – AAA
Track and Field – AAA
Volleyball – AAAA
Water Polo – AAAA

Boys
Baseball – AAAAAA
Basketball- AAAAAA
Bowling – AAAAAA
Cross Country – AAA
JROTC Drill Team – AAA
Football – AAAAAA
Golf – AAA
Indoor Track and Field – AAAA
Soccer – AAAA
Swimming and Diving – AAA
Tennis – AAA
Track and Field – AAA
Volleyball – AAA
Water Polo – AAAA
Wrestling – AAA

Notable alumni
Sian Barbara Allen, actress
Albert Boscov, businessman, philanthropist, and former chairman of Boscov's
James Bryant, former professional football player, Detroit Lions
Thomas Caltagirone, former Pennsylvania State Representative
Henry Dickinson Green, former U.S. Congressman
Stu Jackson, former head coach, New York Knicks
Donyell Marshall, former professional basketball player, Chicago Bulls, Cleveland Cavaliers, Golden State Warriors, Minnesota Timberwolves, Philadelphia 76ers, Utah Jazz, and Seattle SuperSonics
Maurio McCoy, professional skateboarder  
Lenny Moore, former professional football player, Baltimore Colts, and Pro Football Hall of Fame inductee
Stephen Mull, former U.S. ambassador to Lithuania
Curtis R. Reitz, law professor, University of Pennsylvania Law School
Lonnie Walker, professional basketball player, Los Angeles Lakers
William Wiswesser, chemist and pioneer in chemical informatics
Gus Yatron, former U.S. Congressman

References

External links
 

Buildings and structures in Reading, Pennsylvania
Public high schools in Pennsylvania
Schools in Berks County, Pennsylvania
Educational institutions established in 1927
1927 establishments in Pennsylvania